Pyhia or Pyihia or Petepihu was an Ancient Egyptian princess during the 18th Dynasty, a daughter of Thutmose IV.

Her mummy was reburied in the Sheikh Abd el-Qurna cache along with that of several other princesses: her probable sisters Amenemopet and Tiaa; her niece Nebetia and Princesses Tatau, Henutiunu, Merytptah, Sithori and Wiay. The tomb was discovered in 1857.

Citations

Sources
 
 

15th-century BC Egyptian women
14th-century BC Egyptian women
Princesses of the Eighteenth Dynasty of Egypt
Ancient Egyptian mummies
Children of Thutmose IV